Fritt Ord Award consists of two prizes awarded by the  Fritt Ord Foundation  (Stiftelsen Fritt Ord).  Two prizes are awarded in  support of freedom of speech and freedom of expression; the Fritt Ord Award and the Fritt Ord Honorary Award.
These are awards are distributed annually during the month of  May in connection with the anniversary  of the liberation of  Norway  at the end of World War II in May 1945.
Prizes are awarded to one or more persons or organizations that have contributed to areas where the organization works, especially in the work of freedom of expression. In addition to a monetary reward, the award includes a statue by sculptor Nils Aas.

Fritt Ord  Foundation was founded on 7 June 1974 by Jens Henrik Nordlie (1910–1996) who served as CEO of  Narvesen from 1957 to 1975, corporate director  Finn Skedsmo and  jurist Jens Christian Hauge (1915–2006) . 
The foundation was funded by Narvesen, the Norwegian based chain of convenience stores and news outlets.

Fritt Ord Award
These are the laureates of the Fritt Ord Award:

1976 : Johan Vogt
1977 : Henrik Groth
1978 : Kim Friele
1979 : Stein Mehren
1980 : Andrey Sakharov
1982 : Lech Walesa and Hallvard Rieber-Mohn
1983 : Kjetil Bang-Hansen
1984 :	Nordnorsk forfatterlag
1985 :	Den illegale presses forening
1986 : Magli Elster and Torolf Elster
1987 : Nansen Academy
1988 : Leo Eitinger
1989 : Erik Bye
1990 : Charta 77
1991 :	Nordland Akademi for Kunst og Vitenskap
1992 : Annette Thommessen
1993 : Rolv Ryssdal
1994 : William Nygaard
1995 : Hanne Sophie Greve
1996 : Arne Skouen
1997 : Kåre Willoch
1998 : Alexander Nikitin
1999 : NRK P2
2000 : Thomas Chr. Wyller
2001 : Nils Christie
2002 : Aslam Ahsan and Shabana Rehman
2003 : Berge Furre
2004 : Unni Wikan
2005 : Nina Witoszek
2006 : Bjørgulv Braanen
2007 : Terje Tvedt
2008 : Per-Yngve Monsen
2009 : Nina Karin Monsen
2010 : Bushra Ishaq and Abid Q. Raja
2011 : Anders Sømme Hammer
2012 : Sara Azmeh Rasmussen
2013 : Per Fugelli
2014 : Anne Sender
2015 : Robin Schaefer and Jan Erik Skog
2016 : Robert Mood
2017 : Dag og Tid
2018 : Harald Amdal, Eirik Linaker Berglund, Thor Harald Henriksen and Kenneth Hætta
2019 : Natur og Ungdom and Greta Thunberg
2020 : Deeyah Khan.
2021 : Jan Grue, Bjørn Hatterud og Olaug Nilssen
2022 : Meduza

Fritt Ord Honorary Award
These are the laureates of the Fritt Ord Honorary Award:

1979 : Hans Heiberg
1980 : Philip Houm, Hermod Skånland, Anne Ma Ødegaard
1981 : none
1982 : Hans Børli
1983 : none
1984 : Arvid Hanssen, Lars Roar Langslet, Alf Steinsøy, Anne-Lisa Amadou
1985 : Johs. Andenæs, Carsten Smith, Dag Sørli
1986 : Åge Rønning, Odd Kvaal Pedersen, Radio Immigranten, Anders Bratholm
1987 : Petter Wessel Zapffe, Harald Tveterås, Birgitte Grimstad, Lillebjørn Nilsen
1988 : Barthelemy Niava
1989 : Hå Gamle Prestegard, Espevør Husmorlag, Thomas Thiis-Evensen
1990 : Jahn Thon, Egil Bakke, Edvard Beyer, Elisabeth Gording, Bestemødrene foran Stortinget, Sidsel Mørck
1991 : Stiftelsen Aur Prestegård
1992 : Odd Abrahamsen, Arquebus Krigshistorisk museum, Svein Ellingsen, Erik Hillestad, Egil Hovland
1993 : Jon Godal, Sverre Ødegaard, Arild Haaland, Dagmar Loe, Anne-May Nilsen
1994 : Carl Fredrik Thorsager, Helga Arntzen
1995 : Harald Noreng, Hans P.S. Knudsen
1996 : Kari Risvik, Kari Vogt, Christian Norberg-Schulz, Rune Slagstad, Cato Guhnfeldt, Axel Jensen, Knut Wigert
1997 : Nasa Borba
1998 : Kristin Brudevoll, Erik Damman, Ørnulf Ranheimsæter
1999 : Aldo Keel
2000 : Tor Bomann-Larsen, Hans Fredrik Dahl, Geir Hestmark, Geir Kjetsaa, Torill Steinfeld, Jan Otto Hauge, Reidar Hirsti, Ivan Kristoffersen, Arve Solstad, Kadra Yusuf
2001 : Åsne Seierstad
2002 : Ottar Brox, Åge Hovengen
2003 : Willy A. Kirkeby
2004 : Kristian Ottosen
2005 : Trygve Refsdal, Hermund Slaattelid
2006 : Tom Martinsen
2007 : Janet Garton, Ljubiša Rajić, Ebba Haslund, Sissel Benneche Osvold, Niels Christian Geelmuyden
2008 : Arnhild Lauveng
2009 : Else Michelet, Erik Fosse, Mads Gilbert
2010 : Harald Eia, Dag O. Hessen, Bjørn Vassnes
2011 : Odd S. Lovoll
2012 : Simon Flem Devold, Louiza Louhibi, Nina Johnsrud
2013 : Per Edgar Kokkvold, Nils E. Øy
2015 : Fredens Ring, Flemming Rose, Vebjørn Selbekk 
2016 : Walid al-Kubaisi and Loveleen Rihel Brenna
2017 : Leo Ajkic, "The Shameless Girls" (represented by Amina Bile, Nancy Herz and Sofia Srour), Kristin Clemet
2018 : Simon Malkenes (May), Odd Isungset (October)
2019 : Levi Fragell, Hans Fredrik Dahl, Frank Nervik, Norun Haugen, Ola Waagen and Piraya Film 
2020 : Sara Johnsen and Pål Sletaune
2021 : Utøya and Jørgen Watne Frydnes
2022 : Lise Klaveness

References

External links
Stiftelsen Fritt Ords website

Free expression awards
Norwegian awards
Awards established in 1976
1976 establishments in Norway